JDS Isonami (DD-104) was the second ship of Ayanami-class destroyers.

Construction and career
Isonami was laid down at Mitsubishi Heavy Industries Kobe Shipyard on 14 December 1956 and launched on 30 September 1957. She was commissioned on 14 March 1958.  

On March 31, 1958, she was transferred to the Yokosuka District Force 8th Escort Corps. On October 25, the same year, the 8th Escort Corps was reorganized into the 1st Escort Corps group. During the special repair work from 1962 to 1963, the equipment was modernized, and the unequipped radio wave detector (ESM) NORL-1 was put in the back. Replaced equipment and search sonar with OQS-12 and attack sonar with OQY-2.       

On December 24, 1964, she left Yokosuka for a trial run, and the bow of the Liberia-registered tanker Olympic Grace (37,000 tons) collided with the rear port side and was damaged due to heavy fog.      

In March 1966, two depth charge projectors on the rear deck and two depth charge drop rails were removed, and equipped with variable depth sonar (VDS) OQA-1A.       

In 1972, the short torpedo launcher was removed, and work was carried out to strengthen the anti-submarine attack capability with two 68-type triple short torpedo launchers.      

On June 13, 1975, the 8th Escort Squadron was abolished and transferred to the 1st Training Squadron of the Training Squadron, and the home port was transferred to Kure. 

In 1976, the ship was remodeled into a training ship with the escort ship registered, and the 4-unit long torpedo launcher was removed and a trainee auditorium was newly established. 

On March 30, 1983, she was changed to a training ship and her registration number was changed to TV-3502. 

She was removed from the register on July 1, 1987 with her sister ship JDS Shikinami. 

In 1988, she made preparations for use as an actual ship target at the Etajima Shipyard, and was sank as a target ship for anti-ship guided bullets.

Gallery

Citations

References 

1957 ships
Ayanami-class destroyers
Ships built by Mitsubishi Heavy Industries